{{DISPLAYTITLE:Lambda1 Tucanae}}

Lambda1 Tucanae is the Bayer designation for one member of a pair of stars sharing a common proper motion through space, which lie within the southern constellation of Tucana. As of 2013, the pair had an angular separation of 20.0 arc seconds along a position angle of 82°. Together, they are barely visible to the naked eye with a combined apparent visual magnitude of 6.21. Based upon an annual parallax shift for both stars of approximately 16.5 mas as seen from Earth, this system is located roughly 198 light years from the Sun.

The brighter member, component A, is a magnitude 6.70 F-type star with a stellar classification of F7 IV-V. The luminosity class may indicate that, at the age of 2.6 billion years, it is beginning to evolve away from the main sequence. It has an estimated 1.55 times the mass of the Sun and is radiating 7 times the solar luminosity from its photosphere at an effective temperature of 6,325 K. The magnitude 7.35 companion, component B, has 1.38 times the mass of the Sun. If the pair are gravitationally bound, then their estimated orbital period is 27,000 years.

References

F-type subgiants
Binary stars
Tucanae, Lambda
Tucana (constellation)
Durchmusterung objects
005190/208
004084/8
0252
Suspected variables
G-type main-sequence stars